Wu Gaojun (born 6 March 1985) is a Chinese professional football coach and former player.

Club career
Wu Gaojun broke into the senior side of Liaoning FC on 15 May 2005 in a league game against Shenzhen Jianlibao in a 3-1 victory. After making his debut he would become a fringe player within the team until the 2008 league season when he was given his chance to establish himself within the team, however at the end of the season the team could not avoid relegation to the second tier. Despite this he remained with the team to become a vital member within the team's defence and aided the team to an immediate return into the top tier when he saw the club win the division title.

Club career stats
Statistics accurate as of match played 3 November 2018.

Honours
Liaoning FC
China League One: 2009

References

External links
Player profile at titan24.com
Player stats at Sohu.com
 

1985 births
Living people
Footballers from Dalian
Liaoning F.C. players
China League One players
Chinese Super League players
Association football defenders
Chinese footballers